Operation Sledgehammer was an Allied plan for a cross-Channel invasion of Europe during World War II, as the first step in helping to reduce pressure on the Soviet Red Army by establishing a Second Front. It was to be executed in 1942 and acted as a contingency alternative to Operation Roundup, the original Allied plan for the invasion of Europe in 1943. Allied forces were to seize the French Atlantic ports of either Brest or Cherbourg and areas of the Cotentin Peninsula during the early autumn of 1942, and amass troops for a breakout in the spring of 1943.

The operation was eagerly pressed for by both the United States military and the Soviet Union, but rejected by the British, who concluded a landing in France was premature, and hence impractical. As a result, Sledgehammer was never carried out, and instead the British proposal for an invasion of French North Africa took place in November 1942 under the code name Operation Torch.

History

Background 
After the United States entered World War II in December 1941, the U.S. Joint Chiefs of Staff pressed for an invasion of mainland Europe via the English Channel "as soon as possible". In March 1942, in a letter to British Prime Minister Winston Churchill, U.S. President Franklin Roosevelt wrote:

On 8 April, General George Marshall and Harry Hopkins arrived in Britain to press the case for two possible American plans for a landing in Occupied France, Operation Roundup and Operation Sledgehammer.

Operation Roundup plan
Roundup was the original Allied plan for the invasion of continental Europe. It was to be mounted before April 1943 and executed by 48 divisions, 18 of which would be British.

Operation Sledgehammer plan
Sledgehammer was a plan to capture the French seaports of either Brest or Cherbourg during the early autumn of 1942 if Germany or the Soviet Union was at the brink of collapse. Sledgehammer was to be carried out mainly by British troops as the Americans could only supply two or three trained divisions in time. Churchill responded that it was "more difficult, less attractive, less immediately helpful or ultimately fruitful than Roundup". After capturing Cherbourg and areas on the Cotentin Peninsula, the beachhead was to be defended and held through the winter of 1942 and into 1943 while troops were massed for a breakout operation to take place in spring 1943. The plan became popular and received the code name Sledgehammer. Hopkins added additional political weight to the proposed plan by opining that if US public opinion had anything to do with it, the war effort would be directed instead against Japan if an invasion of mainland Europe was not mounted soon.

However, the elements required for such an operation were lacking: air superiority, amphibious warfare equipment, sufficient forces and adequate supply. In spite of this, the Joint Chiefs of Staff considered Sledgehammer to be feasible.

If Sledgehammer had been carried out, the British could have landed only six divisions at most, but the Germans had 25-30 divisions in Western Europe. Assuming that it could be established in the first place, a beachhead on the Cotentin peninsula would be blocked off and attacked by land, sea and air. Cherbourg, the only suitable port, would no doubt be mined, and aircraft and artillery would be expected to attack the town in strength while the German armored forces were brought to bear.

The pressure to mount Sledgehammer increased further when Soviet Foreign Minister Vyacheslav Molotov arrived in Britain to press for a Second Front. After trying and failing to persuade Churchill, Molotov travelled on to Washington where he enjoyed a better reception and received more support for his requests. He then returned to London and was convinced that a second front in 1942 was actually part of Anglo-American policy.

Course of events

British officials pressed for action in North Africa, which would allow relatively-inexperienced American forces to gain experience in a less risky theatre and the gradual buildup of overwhelming force before Germany was engaged head on. At the Second Washington Conference in June 1942, President Roosevelt and Prime Minister Churchill decided to postpone the cross-English Channel invasion until 1943 and make the first priority the opening a second front in North Africa. At the Second Claridge Conference in London, July 20 – 26, Churchill and Roosevelt aid Harry Hopkins agreed to substitute Operation Torch, the invasion of French North Africa, for US reinforcement of the Western Desert campaign.

Senior U.S. commanders expressed strong opposition to the landings and after the western Allied Combined Chiefs of Staff (CCS) met in London on 30 July, General Marshall and Admiral Ernest King declined to approve the plan. Marshall and other U.S. generals continued to advocate Operation Sledgehammer, which the British rejected. After Prime Minister Churchill pressed for a landing in French North Africa in 1942, Marshall suggested instead to President Roosevelt that the U.S. abandon the Germany first strategy and take the offensive in the Pacific. Roosevelt said it would do nothing to help Russia. With Marshall unable to persuade the British to change their minds, President Roosevelt gave a direct order that Torch was to have precedence over other operations and was to take place at the earliest possible date, one of only two direct orders he gave to military commanders during the war. Torch met the British objective of securing victory in North Africa and the American objective to engage in the fight against Nazi Germany on a limited scale.

In the interim, a large-scale Canadian-led raid on the French coast was planned to take some of the pressure off the Soviet Union.

In November 1942 Eisenhower, now a lieutenant general, told Churchill that no major operation on the Continent could be carried out before 1944.

See also 
 Diplomatic history of World War II

References

Further reading 
 

Battles and operations of World War II
Cancelled military operations involving the United Kingdom
Cancelled military operations involving the United States
Cancelled invasions
Cancelled military operations of World War II